Huang Ming may refer to:

 Huang Ming, a name for the Ming dynasty
 Huang Ming (politician) (born 1957), Deputy Minister of Public Security of China
 Huang Ming (military officer) (born 1963), Deputy Commander of the People's Liberation Army Ground Force.
 Huang Ming (entrepreneur) (born 1958), founder of Himin Solar
 Huang Ming (actor) (born 1986), an actor from China.